Nina O'Brien (born November 29, 1997) is an American World Cup alpine ski racer and specializes in the technical events of giant slalom and slalom. 

O'Brien competed for the United States at the 2022 Winter Olympics, and was in sixth place in the giant slalom after the first run. She crashed near the finish of the second run, suffering multiple leg fractures.

World Cup results

Season standings

Top ten finishes

0 podiums; 3 top tens (2 GS, 1 SL)

World Championship results

Olympic results

References

External links

Nina O'Brien at U.S. Ski Team

1997 births
Living people
American female alpine skiers
Sportspeople from San Francisco
21st-century American women
Alpine skiers at the 2022 Winter Olympics
Olympic alpine skiers of the United States